Caerfarchell is a small village in Pembrokeshire, Wales, 3 miles northeast of St Davids, close by the A487 road. It is in the community of St Davids and the Cathedral Close.

Description
Several houses are built around a small village green.

In 2001 the Pembrokeshire Coast National Park Authority drew up a conservation statement with the help of villagers.

History
It is believed the village originated in the 14th or 15th centuries. Early medieval burials have been recorded. An early 19th century farm building opposite the chapel is a Grade II-listed building and there are nine other listed buildings in the vicinity.

Chapel
A Calvinist Methodist Chapel was built in 1763 and replaced by the current building in 1827. It is Grade II* listed.

References

Villages in Pembrokeshire